Madame Aema 2 (애마부인 2 - Aemabuin 2) is a 1984 South Korean film directed by Jeong In-yeob.

Plot
Aema and her husband Hyeon-woo, from Madame Aema (1982) have now divorced. While on vacation on Jeju Island, Aema contemplates her current love affairs with a young entrepreneur jae-ha and sang-yeon, who is a junior of his former husband and collects butterflies in jeju, and returning to her husband, who is now living with another woman. Being lonely, aema rides a horse in the wilderness and makes out with sang-yeon in a tent. Resolving to become independent, Aema declares that love and marriage are separate things.

Cast
 Oh Su-bi: Madame Aema
 Ha Jae-young: Dong-yeob
 Sin Il-ryong: Sang-yeon
 Choe Yun-seok: Hyeon-woo
 Kim Ae-kyung: Erika
 Bang Hee: Hye-ryeon
 Hyeon Ji-hye: Ji-hee

Bibliography

English

Korean

Notes

Madame Aema
1984 films
1980s erotic films
1980s Korean-language films
South Korean sequel films